Sarıhəsənli (also, Sarygasanli) is a village in the Gadabay Rayon of Azerbaijan.  The village forms part of the municipality of Şəkərbəy.

References 

Populated places in Gadabay District